The American Community Gardening Association (ACGA) is a non-profit organization of volunteers, professionals and member-organizations working in support of community greening in rural and urban areas across Canada and the United States. ACGA and its member organizations work together to promote community food and ornamental gardening, preservation and management of open space, urban forestry, and integrated planning and management of developing urban and rural lands.

See also
 Community gardening in the United States

Further reading
Landwehr Engle, Debra. Grace from the Garden: Changing the World One Garden at a Time. Rodale Books: 2003. .
Schaye, Kim and Chris Losee. Stronger Than Dirt: How One Urban Couple Grew a Business, a Family, and a New Way of Life from the Ground Up. Three Rivers Press: 2003. .

References

External links
American Community Gardening Association website

Community gardening in the United States
Rodale, Inc.
Horticultural organizations based in the United States
Urban forestry organizations